Line 17 of the Beijing Subway is a rapid transit line partially in operation in Beijing. It is operated by Beijing MTR Corporation Limited.

The south section of Line 17 opened on 31 December 2021. The north section of Line 17 will open in 2023, and the middle section of Line 17 will open in 2024.

Description
Line 17 is planned to run from the Future Science Park North station in Changping District to Jiahuihu station in Tongzhou District. The expected end to end travel time to be approximately 56 minutes. When complete, the line will provide relief to the congestion on Line 5, Line 10 and Line 13.

Rolling stock

Line 17 uses 8-car Type A rolling stock.

Opening time

Stations

History

In January 2011, an official with the city's planning committee indicated that Line 17 of the subway was planned to run east–west through the city's Central Business District under Guanghua Road with transfers to Lines 4 and 5. However, the line run through Central Business District is known as Line 28 now.

In February 2012, the city's planning committee identified a different Line 17, as a line planned for 2020, that would run north–south from Tiantongyuan to Yizhuang that would run parallel and to the east of Line 5. On June 15, 2012, the city government disclosed tentatively planned stations for the line.

On 10 October 2013, city authorities confirmed that Line 17 would run from the Future Science Park North station in Changping District to Yizhuang Zhanqianqu South station in Tongzhou District.

Construction of the line began in 2015.

On 8 July 2022, an EIA document prepared by the China Academy of Railway Sciences (CARS) regarding Phase III (2022–2027) construction of the Beijing Subway announced an  branch line of Line 17 from Tiantongyuandong Station to Beiqijia, with one intermediate station not identified.

References

Beijing Subway lines
MTR Corporation
Proposed public transport in China
Proposed buildings and structures in Beijing
Transport infrastructure under construction in China
Railway lines opened in 2021